Smithsville is a community in the Canadian province of Nova Scotia, located in the Municipality of the District of Barrington of Shelburne County.

Smithsville is one of a string of communities along Port LaTour Road, which is the only paved road into or out of Smithsville. The sign at the northern limit of Smithsville reads "Smithsville", but the sign at the southern limit reads "Smithville."

See also
 List of communities in Nova Scotia

References

External links
Smithsville on Destination Nova Scotia

Communities in Shelburne County, Nova Scotia
General Service Areas in Nova Scotia
Populated coastal places in Canada